XHEORO-FM is a radio station on 93.7 FM in Guasave, Sinaloa. It is operated by Radiosistema del Noroeste and known as La Mera Jefa with a grupera format.

History
XEORO-AM 680 received its concession on January 28, 1964. The 1,000-watt daytimer was owned by Óscar Chávez Castro.

XEORO migrated to FM in 2011 as XHEORO-FM 93.7.

Despite being owned by a member of the Chávez López family that owns Grupo Chávez Radio, XHEORO is operated by Radiosistema del Noroeste. In June 2016, the IFT approved the transfer of the XHEORO concession to Grupo RSN de Guasave, S.A. de C.V.

References

Radio stations in Sinaloa
Radio stations established in 1964